A tiger economy is the economy of a country which undergoes rapid economic growth, usually accompanied by an increase in the standard of living. The term was originally used for the Four Asian Tigers (South Korea, Taiwan, Hong Kong, and Singapore) as tigers are important in Asian symbolism, which also inspired the Tiger Cub Economies (Indonesia, Malaysia, Thailand, Vietnam and the Philippines). The Asian Tigers also inspired other economies later on; the Anatolian Tigers (certain cities in Turkey) in the 1980s, the Gulf Tiger (Dubai) in the 1990s, the Celtic Tiger (Republic of Ireland) in 1995–2000, the Baltic tigers (Baltic states) in 2000–2007, and the Tatra Tiger (Slovakia) in 2002–2007. 

In the 1960s, the Philippines, Sri Lanka and Myanmar were considered as the "Tiger of Asia" Economies as all three countries were experiencing high growth. Internal issues however led to the economies of all three countries to falter. Israel's rapid economic growth in the 1990s, and again in the 2000s and 2010s following a brief recession, earned it a reputation as a tiger economy, and one newspaper dubbed it the "Hebrew tiger." Bangladesh has been described as an emerging "Asian tiger" in recent years due to its high economic growth and industrialization which bear many similarities to the way the Four Asian Tigers industrialized between the 1960s and 1990s.

Another tiger economy is that of Armenia. Because of the remarkable, often two-digit economic growth that Armenia showed until the 2007–08 financial crisis, it emerged as the Caucasian Tiger. During this period, sustained economic growth allowed for economic stability, moderate fiscal deficits and external debt, as well as declining poverty rates.

Similar economies 
The Pacific Pumas has been used to describe fast-growing & emerging economies in Latin America such as Mexico, Chile, Peru & Colombia.

The term lion economy or African Lions is used as an analogy to describe emerging economies in Africa. Countries considered to be "African Lions" are South Africa, Morocco, Algeria, Libya, Botswana, Egypt, Mauritius, and Tunisia.

The term "wolf economy" is used to describe Mongolia's rapidly growing economy.

The Caucasian Tiger 
The establishment of macroeconomic stability and the steadfast pursuit of reforms aimed at constructing a market economy that was integrated with the rest of the world are to be attributed for Armenia's emergence as the Caucasian Tiger.During the five years preceding 2007, the Armenian economy has grown by double-digit rates annually on average—similar to the East Asian tiger economies—and maintained high growth rates even before. Armenia quickly recovered from the output shock experienced by transition economies. Dating from 1994, its upturn in output reaches to the experience of the Baltic States and Central Europe and precedes by four to five years the recovery in the rest of the former Soviet Union (FSU). Armenia's growth was caused by productivity gains in the private sector as macroeconomic stability took hold; Armenia rapidly expanded the role of private markets, and it adopted necessary institutional measures to ensure free price formation, private ownership of assets (including land), and industrial restructuring, liberal trade in goods services and investment. Moreover, the defeat of inflation and predictability in financial policies' stance was caused by adopting responsible fiscal and monetary policies in the late 1990s. Thus, the foundations of impressive growth performance were laid because first-generation structural and institutional reforms were achieved. In 2022, similar double-digit economic growth has been observed; in particular, a 14% GDP growth has been estimated as a result of such factors as the influx of foreigners (mainly Russians) due to the Russian-Ukrainian war.

See also 
 Economic miracle
 Tiger Cub Economies

References

 
Economic booms